Monte Caburaí is a mountain located on the border between the South American countries of Brazil and Guyana standing at  above sea level.

See also
 Extreme points of Brazil

References

Caburai
Caburai
Brazil–Guyana border
International mountains of South America
Extreme points of Brazil